The 1989–90 Biathlon World Cup was a multi-race tournament over a season of biathlon, organised by the UIPMB (Union Internationale de Pentathlon Moderne et Biathlon). The season started on 14 December 1989 in Obertilliach, Austria, and ended on 18 March 1990 in Kontiolahti, Finland. It was the 13th season of the Biathlon World Cup.

Originally, the World Championships were to be held in Minsk. However, due to a lack of snow, only the individual competitions could be held, and the team, sprint and relay races were moved to Holmenkollen. This caused the UIPMB to declare the World Championship races as counting towards the World Cup. On the last day in Holmenkollen, the men's relay was cancelled during the last leg due to fog; it was subsequently moved to Kontiolahti.

Calendar
Below is the World Cup calendar for the 1989–90 season.

 1991 World Championship races were not included in the 1990–91 World Cup scoring system.
 The relays were technically unofficial races as they did not count towards anything in the World Cup.

World Cup Podium

Men

Women

Men's team

Women's team

Standings: Men

Overall 

Final standings after 12 races.

Individual 

Final standings after 6 races.

Sprint 

Final standings after 6 races.

Nation 

Final standings after 16 races.

Standings: Women

Overall 

Final standings after 12 races.

Individual 

Final standings after 6 races.

Sprint 

Final standings after 6 races.

Nation 

Final standings after 16 races.

Medal table

Achievements

Men
First World Cup career victory
, 25, in his 5th season — the WC 2 Individual in Antholz-Anterselva; it also was his first podium
, 19, in his 1st season — the World Championships Sprint in Holmenkollen; first podium was the 1989–90 Sprint in Walchsee
, 28, in his 9th season — the WC 5 Sprint in Kontiolahti; first podium was the 1985–86 Individual in Lahti

First World Cup podium
, 24, in his 1st season — no. 2 in the WC 1 Sprint in Obertilliach
, 27, in his 4th season — no. 2 in the WC 4 Individual in Walchsee
, 19, in his 1st season — no. 3 in the WC 4 Sprint in Walchsee

Victory in this World Cup (all-time number of victories in parentheses)
, 3 (6) first places
, 2 (4) first places
, 1 (11) first place
, 1 (4) first place
, 1 (2) first place
, 1 (2) first place
, 1 (1) first place
, 1 (1) first place
, 1 (1) first place

Women
Victory in this World Cup (all-time number of victories in parentheses)
 , 5 (5) first places
 , 2 (5) first places
 , 2 (3) first places
 , 1 (2) first place
 , 1 (2) first place
 , 1 (1) first place

Retirements
Following notable biathletes retired after the 1989–90 season:

References

Biathlon World Cup
World Cup
World Cup